Mauro Rafael Geral Cerqueira (born 20 August 1992) is a Portuguese professional footballer who plays as a left-back.

References

External links

Portuguese League profile 

1992 births
Living people
People from Loures
Portuguese footballers
Footballers from Lisbon
Association football defenders
Primeira Liga players
Liga Portugal 2 players
Campeonato de Portugal (league) players
Associação Naval 1º de Maio players
C.D. Nacional players
Associação Académica de Coimbra – O.A.F. players
Nemzeti Bajnokság I players
Újpest FC players
First Professional Football League (Bulgaria) players
FC Hebar Pazardzhik players
Portuguese expatriate footballers
Expatriate footballers in Hungary
Expatriate footballers in Bulgaria
Portuguese expatriate sportspeople in Hungary
Portuguese expatriate sportspeople in Bulgaria